Vahid Hamidi Nejad is an Iranian footballer who plays for Esteghlal Khuzestan F.C. in the Persian Gulf Pro League.

Club career
Hamidi Nejad joined Saba Qom F.C. in 2010 after spending the previous season at Aluminium Hormozgan F.C.

 Assist Goals

References

1982 births
Living people
Iranian footballers
Saba players
Naft Tehran F.C. players
Aluminium Hormozgan F.C. players
Pars Jonoubi Jam players
People from Sarab, East Azerbaijan
Association football fullbacks